The Danube Boatman (Italian:Il barcaiolo del Danubio) is a 1914 Italian silent film directed by Roberto Roberti and starring Bice Valerian and Claudia Zambuto.

Cast
 Giuseppe De Witten 
 Giulio Donadio 
 Frederico Elvezi 
 Giovanni Pezzinga 
 Roberto Roberti
 Bice Valerian 
 Oreste Visalli 
 Claudia Zambuto

References

Bibliography
 Gian Piero Brunetta. Il cinema muto italiano: de "La presa di Roma" a "Sole" 1905-1929. Laterza, 2008.

External links

1914 films
1910s Italian-language films
Films directed by Roberto Roberti
Italian silent feature films
Italian black-and-white films